Aryna Sabalenka was the defending champion, but she chose not to compete this year.

Anett Kontaveit won her maiden WTA 500 title without dropping a set, defeating Maria Sakkari in the final, 6–2, 7–5.

Seeds
The top four seeds received a bye into the second round.

Draw

Finals

Top half

Bottom half

Qualifying

Seeds

Qualifiers

Lucky losers

Qualifying draw

First qualifier

Second qualifier

Third qualifier

Fourth qualifier

Fifth qualifier

Sixth qualifier

External links
 Main draw
 Qualifying draw

2021 WTA Tour
2021 Singles
2021 in Czech tennis